Sureterm Direct is a specialist insurance intermediary in the United Kingdom.  It is best known for placing risks for Four-wheel drive and Recreational vehicle insurance.

Sureterm is headquartered in Godmanchester, equidistant between Cambridge and Peterborough, in an old  public house.  It has been rumoured that the building is haunted and sometimes late at night some have claimed to have seen a ghost.

Sureterm is often seen at Classic car shows It is involved sponsoring in the Renault Clio Cup in 2003 and British Touring Cars in 2004,
but advertises only in the core markets of Land Rover and motorhome insurance.

Sureterm was established in 1998 by Andy Wood and Janice Purbrick.  Wood previously worked in Marketing and Insurance and was an avid car fanatic, and Ms. Purbrick had built her career in Accountancy.

Wood and Purbrick, whilst still running the company, often got involved in charity work today, including donations to local Huntingdon causes.

The Company was sold to the Capita Group in April 2010 and now trades alongside sister companies, Lancaster Insurance, Hero Insurance and BDML amongst others. In 2013, Sureterm, along with Lancaster, Hero and BDML, was sold to Markerstudy Group.

References

External links
 Sureterm Direct Insurance

Insurance companies of the United Kingdom